Montcada i Reixac, often referred to as simply Montcada, is a municipality in the comarca of the Vallès Occidental in Catalonia, Spain. It is situated at the confluence of the Ripoll river and the Besós river, and very close to the northernmost neighbourhoods of the city of Barcelona and is therefore a part of the metropolitan area of Barcelona. It had 33,656 inhabitants according to the 2010 census.

Neighbourhoods
The following areas make up the urban tissue of Montcada: Can Cuiàs, Can Pomada, Can Sant Joan (Bifurcació), Carrerada (Montcada Nova), Font Pudenta, La Ribera (Valentine), Mas Duran, Mas Rampinyo, Montcada Centre, Pla d'en Coll, Terra Nostra (Santa Maria de Montcada) i Vallençana-Reixac. The municipality includes a small exclave to the north between Palau-solità i Plegamans and Mollet del Vallès.

Transport

The town is served by the A-7 autopista, the N-152 road, six RENFE Rodalies Barcelona and regional railway stations used by several lines, and the terminus Barcelona Metro line 11, located at Can Cuiàs.

The GR 92 long distance footpath, which roughly follows the length of the Mediterranean coast of Spain, has a staging point at Montcada i Reixac.

Twin towns
 Águilas, Spain

References

 Panareda Clopés, Josep Maria; Rios Calvet, Jaume; Rabella Vives, Josep Maria (1989). Guia de Catalunya, Barcelona: Caixa de Catalunya.  (Spanish).  (Catalan).

External links 

Montcada i Reixac city council
 Government data pages 

 
Municipalities in Vallès Occidental